Ad. Manatuto or Associação Desportiva Manatuto is a football club of East Timor from Manatuto. The team plays in the Taça Digicel.

References

Football clubs in East Timor
Football
Manatuto Municipality
Association football clubs established in 2010
2010 establishments in East Timor